Wonderful Days (also known as Sky Blue) is a South Korean animated science fiction film, released in 2003, written and directed by Kim Moon-saeng. It features backdrops rendered using photo-realistic computer-generated imagery (CGI), comparable to those in the film Final Fantasy: The Spirits Within, along with the use of highly detailed models for some of the backdrops into which the cel animated characters were then animated. However, convincing CGI animation of humans (especially human movement) was not attempted. The backgrounds in the film were shot with traditional motion control techniques, then processed to look like computer graphics. The vehicles were all rendered, and the characters were cel animated.

Plot 
Wonderful Days is set in 2142. Environmental pollution has led to a breakdown of human civilization. A technologically advanced city named Ecoban was built and it harvests energy from the DELOS System, which uses pollution in a carbonite catalyzed reaction to generate power. Carbonite extraction is carried out by people who live outside the city in the surrounding wasteland. Among them is an enigmatic young man known as Shua. He ends up in a love triangle with his childhood friend, Jay, and her superior, Ecoban security commander Cade.

The film deals with environmental destruction, pollution and class struggle.

Voice Cast

Production 
Along with CG effects, a set of miniatures for buildings, mechanics, and characters were built and filmed with HDW-F900 which was co-developed by Sony and Lucasfilm and one of two prototype Frazier lens (the other was used for Star Wars by Lucasfilm).

Micah Wright and Jay Lender contributed to the script of the film, although they have not been credited in the final film.

Releases 
The film has been released in numerous Western countries such as the US and Great Britain under the title Sky Blue. These versions have been slightly distorted, with the loss of two minutes of the running time compared to the original Korean cut. Other Western countries such as France and Finland have kept its original title—which is a Hangul transliteration of the English phrase "Wonderful Days" (it would be rendered in Revised Romanization as ""). An all-region 2-disc collector's edition DVD to the dubbed version of the film was released in the UK on November 14, 2005. A Blu-ray of the film was eventually released in the UK on June 8, 2008. The film was scheduled for release in the US on Blu-ray disc on June 28, 2008. As that date neared, it was rescheduled for June 23, 2009, however, the financial situation of Palisades Tartan in America has thrown a US domestic release into doubt.

In Japan, the film was adapted by Gainax. According to adaptation director Hiroshi Yamaga, Gainax changed the direction of the film to make the dialogue less "alien" to Japanese viewers.

The film was released on DVD in Korea on September 6, 2003. On May 27, 2004, the film was re-released on a 3-disc limited original edition DVD in Korea that features a director's cut of the film. This version includes 9 minutes of additional footage that wasn't present in the original cut, plus a few changes to the dialogue. On May 15, 2013, the director's cut was released on Blu-ray, but uses the bonus material from the DVD to the theatrical cut.

Festivals
Wonderful Days was screened at the following film festivals:
 Sitges International Film Festival, 2003;
 San Sebastian International Film Festival, 2003;
 Cannes Film Festival, 2003;
 Sundance Film Festival, 2004;
 Brussels Fantasy Film Festival, 2004;
 Annecy International Animation Film Festival, 2004;
 Venice Film Festival, 2004;
 Tokyo Film Festival, 2004;
 London Film Festival, 2004;
 Holland Animation Film Festival, 2004;
 San Francisco Film Festival, 2004;
 Grand Prix Anim'arts, Gérardmer, 2004;

References

External links
 
 
 
 
 Review at CyberPunkReview

2000s action adventure films
2003 science fiction action films
2003 films
2003 animated films
Science fiction anime and manga
2000s fantasy adventure films
South Korean animated science fiction films
South Korean animated fantasy films
American animated science fiction films
2000s Korean-language films
South Korean science fiction action films
Animated post-apocalyptic films
Environmental films
Fiction set in the 2140s
2000s American films
2000s South Korean films